Bloomfield Square is a historic district in Bloomfield, Iowa, United States. It consists of the Davis County Courthouse, located on a central park, surrounded by 55 commercial buildings.  The buildings were all built between the 1850s and the 1890s. Most of the buildings are of brick construction with no early frame buildings on the square. No one architectural style predominates. The block that faces Franklin Street burned to the ground in 1893, and was rebuilt that same year. The use of pressed tin and the many engaged columns on the second floor level are noteworthy on this block. The Second Empire courthouse (1877) is the focal point for the district. The historic district was listed on the National Register of Historic Places in 1976.

References

Victorian architecture in Iowa
Bloomfield, Iowa
Buildings and structures in Davis County, Iowa
National Register of Historic Places in Davis County, Iowa
Historic districts on the National Register of Historic Places in Iowa